Candlize is the second album by Hitomi Yaida released on 31 October 2001.
The album title is the coined word which means "the flame of the candle projected onto a pupil" and which was created by Yaida. (Candlize=Candle+Eyes)

Track listing

Notes and references 

2001 albums
Hitomi Yaida albums